Boston's Boy is the debut EP by American rapper Sammy Adams. The EP was released on March 4, 2010, through 1st Round Records.

On July 13, 2010, Adams released four new tracks to make what he called a "deluxe" version of Boston's Boy. These tracks include "Still I Rise", "See Me Now", "Fly Jets Over Boston", and "Just Sayin'". "Still I Rise" features G. Curtis, who recently signed onto Adams' label. "Fly Jets Over Boston" features rapper Curren$y, whom Adams had been working with for a while.

Controversy
Rumors and reports circulated that Adams charged the entirety of his album's first 65,000 purchases to one credit card, which were later proven false with facts that showed all of the purchases were from around the U.S.

Track listing

Charts

References

2010 debut EPs
Sammy Adams albums